Joe Madison Kilgore (December 10, 1918 – February 10, 1999) served from 1955 to 1965 as a U.S. Representative from Texas's 15th congressional district.

Born in Brown County, near Brownwood in west central Texas, Kilgore attended the public schools of Rising Star in Eastland County in north central Texas. In 1929, he moved with his family to Mission in south Texas, where he also attended public schools.

From 1935 to 1936, Kilgore attended Trinity University, then known as Westmoreland College, located in San Antonio, Texas. His legal studies were interrupted at the University of Texas School of Law in July 1941 to enlist in the United States Army Air Corps. He was a combat pilot in the Mediterranean Theater of Operations.

Kilgore was awarded the Silver Star, Distinguished Flying Cross, and Air Medal with two Oak leaf clusters. He was discharged from the Army in 1945 as a lieutenant colonel.

He returned to law school, and in 1946 he was admitted to the bar. He began his law practice in Edinburg, Texas in Hidalgo County in south Texas.

He served as member of the Texas House from 1947 to 1955. He was a delegate to the Democratic National Conventions in 1956, 1960, and 1968.

Kilgore was elected as a Democrat to the Eighty-fourth and to the four succeeding Congresses (January 3, 1955 to January 3, 1965), when he was one of the majority of the Texan delegation to decline to sign the 1956 Southern Manifesto opposing the desegregation of public schools ordered by the Supreme Court in Brown v. Board of Education. Kilgore voted against the Civil Rights Act of 1957 and the 24th Amendment to the U.S. Constitution, but in favor of the Civil Rights Act of 1960. He was not a candidate for renomination in 1964 to the Eighty-ninth Congress. Instead, he resumed the practice of law, residing in Austin until his death there on February 10, 1999. He is interred in Austin at the Texas State Cemetery alongside his wife, the former Jane Redman (1923-2006).

References

1918 births
1999 deaths
Military personnel from Texas
People from Brownwood, Texas
People from Rising Star, Texas
People from Austin, Texas
People from Edinburg, Texas
Burials at Texas State Cemetery
Recipients of the Air Medal
Recipients of the Distinguished Flying Cross (United States)
Recipients of the Silver Star
United States Army Air Forces officers
United States Army Air Forces pilots of World War II
Democratic Party members of the United States House of Representatives from Texas
20th-century American politicians
University of Texas School of Law alumni
United States Army colonels